was the fourth of the six ships completed in the  of light cruisers for the Imperial Japanese Navy (IJN), and like other vessels of her class, she was intended for use as the flagship of a destroyer flotilla. She was named after the Yura River near Kyoto, Japan. She served in the early stages of World War II, and was the first Japanese light cruiser to be lost in that conflict.

Background
Following the production of the five s, an additional three 5,500-ton class light cruisers authorized under the 8-4 Fleet Program were ordered by the Imperial Japanese Navy in 1920. Due to minor changes in design, primarily due to advances in torpedo technology, these three vessels were initially designated as "modified Kuma-class", or "5500-ton class Type II", before being re-designated as a separate class named after the lead vessel, . A second set of three vessels was authorized in late 1920.

Design

The Nagara-class vessels were essentially identical to the previous Kuma-class cruisers, retaining the same hull design, engines and main weaponry, with the addition of the new 610 mm Type 93 Long Lance Torpedoes, which required a larger launcher. However, in silhouette, a major difference from the Kuma class was in the configuration of the bridge, which incorporated an aircraft hangar. Initially, a 33-foot platform was mounted above the No.2 turret, extending over the forward superstructure below the bridge. This was later replaced by an aircraft catapult. Even so, the arrangement proved unwieldy, and the catapult was moved to the rear of each ship in the class, between the No.5 and No.6 turrets during retrofits in 1929–1934.

Service career

Early career
Yura was laid down on 21 May 1921, launched on 15 February 1922 and completed at the Sasebo Naval Arsenal on 20 March 1923. She was commanded by Captain Soemu Toyoda from November 1926 to November 1927. In 1930, she served as a test platform for aircraft catapults installed in front of her bridge and, in 1933-34 received a rotating catapult amidships as well as a new mainmast to support an aircraft derrick. 
Following the Manchurian Incident, Yura was deployed to Shanghai in early 1932 under the command of Captain Mataro Tanimoto until December 1932, and by Captain Rokuzō Sugiyama from June to November 1933. She was again deployed between 1937–1939, to cover landings of Japanese troops in northern China.

Early stages of the Pacific War
On 1 September 1941, Yura was appointed flagship of Rear Admiral Daigo Tadashige's Submarine Squadron 5 and was based in Hainan. At the time of the attack on Pearl Harbor, Yura was covering the first wave of the Malaya Invasion Force south of the Cape of Camau, French Indochina.

On 9 December 1941, Yura and her squadron were ordered to pursue and sink the Royal Navy "Force Z" (the battleship , battlecruiser  and supporting destroyers). Although Yura received word from the submarine  that the British ships were spotted, due to poor wireless reception, the location was unclear and the British vessels were overwhelmed by torpedo bombers of the IJN 22nd Air Flotilla from bases in Indochina before Yura and her submarines could take action.

Yura was then assigned to the invasion of Sarawak from 13 – 26 December 1941, covering landings in Brunei, Miri, Seria, and Kuching. The 2,500 men of the "Kawaguchi Detachment" and the No. 2 Yokosuka Special Naval Landing Force (SNLF) quickly captured Miri's airfield and oil fields. The operation was completed, and Yura returned to its base at Camranh Bay, Indochina by the end of the year.

In February, Yura was assigned to Vice Admiral Ibō Takahashi's IJN Third Fleet, to cover the invasion of Sumatra, protecting the landings of troops at Palembang, Banka Island, and Bantam Bay and Merak on Java. On 1 March 1942, the Dutch submarine  made visual contact with Yura and attacked, launching two torpedoes from 2500–3000 meters, but both either missed or were duds. The Japanese made six depth charge attacks, dropping about 25 depth charges, but K XIV survived and escaped via Sunda Strait to Colombo, Ceylon. On 4 March, Yura rescued the crew of the tanker Erimo (sunk by the submarine ). On 6 March, Yura was assigned to the No. 1 Escort Unit, and continued to cover troop landings in Sumatra and the Andaman Islands through the end of the month.

Indian Ocean Raids
In April, Yura was assigned to the raids in the Indian Ocean under Vice Admiral Jisaburō Ozawa's Second Expeditionary Fleet. Yura and Yūgiri also sank the Dutch motorship Banjoewangi and the British steamer Taksang. At the end of April, Yura returned to Sasebo Naval Arsenal for a refit.

Battle of Midway
On 10 May 1942, Yura was made flagship of Rear Admiral Shōji Nishimura's 4th Destroyer Squadron. At the Battle of Midway, the squadron also included Captain Ranji Oe's 3rd Destroyer Division of 4 destroyers and Captain Yasuo Satō's 9th Destroyer Division of 3 destroyers. The 4th Destroyer Squadron was under the overall command of Vice Admiral Nobutake Kondō, but did not see combat at Midway.

Solomon Islands Campaigns
On 7 August 1942 the United States began "Operation Watchtower" to retake Guadalcanal and the Solomon Islands. Yura was dispatched to Truk with Vice Admiral Kondō's IJN Second Fleet to begin reinforcement operations, and was thus at the Battle of the Eastern Solomons on 24 August 1942.

For the remainder of September 1942, Yura patrolled between Truk, Guadalcanal and the Shortland Islands. On 25 September 1942, while at Shortland, she was attacked by two Boeing B-17 Flying Fortress bombers of the USAAF 11th Bomb Group based at Espiritu Santo and was slightly damaged.

On 11 October 1942, the submarine  claimed a torpedo hit forward of Yuras bridge that inflicted minor damage, but postwar analysis failed to confirm this attack and Yura was apparently not damaged this day. On 12 October 1942, Yura departed Shortland to escort the seaplane tender  and Chitose returning from a transport run from Guadalcanal, and on 14 October 1942, Yura assisted in landing 1,100 troops on Cape Esperance, Guadalcanal. Another "Tokyo Express" troop transport run to Guadalcanal was made on 17 October 1942 to carry 2,100 troops, field artillery pieces and anti-tank guns.

Grampus fired four Mark 14 Torpedoes at Yura. One hit but did not explode, and Yura departed the area with a dent in her port side.

At the north entrance to Indispensable Strait, off Guadalcanal, on 25 October 1942 (the day before the Battle of the Santa Cruz Islands), Yura, leading an attack group of destroyers off Santa Isabel Island in the Solomons was attacked by five SBD Dauntless dive-bombers of VS-71 and hit aft by two bombs near the engine room. She flooded and settled by the stern. After receiving reports of the attack, Vice Admiral Mikawa, CINC, IJN Eighth Fleet, cancelled Rear Admiral Takama's bombardment mission. The No. 2 Attack Unit reversed course back towards Shortland. On the way back, Yura was attacked again by three USAAF P-39 Airacobras and by four Marine SBDs, but these attacks failed to cause any additional damage. Captain Shiro Sato attempted to beach Yura but she was attacked again by four SBDs, three F4F Wildcats and four P-39s. Soon afterwards, Yura was attacked again by six USAAF B-17 Flying Fortress bombers from Espiritu Santo. These attacks reignited Yuras fires. At 18:30, after her crew was taken off, Japanese destroyers Harusame and Yūdachi scuttled Yura with torpedoes. She broke in two and her forward portion sank.

Yura was removed from the navy list on 20 November 1942.

References

Notes

Books

External links

 

Nagara-class cruisers
Ships built by Sasebo Naval Arsenal
1922 ships
Second Sino-Japanese War cruisers of Japan
World War II cruisers of Japan
World War II shipwrecks in the Pacific Ocean
Maritime incidents in October 1942
Scuttled vessels